WIMV 89.3 FM is a radio station licensed to Owingsville, Kentucky. The station broadcasts a Christian music format and is owned by Corban Broadcasting, Inc.

References

External links
 Official Website
 

IMV
Bath County, Kentucky